Le Labo (French: "the lab") is an Estée Lauder perfume brand based in New York City. The Le Labo "Manifesto" states that "the future of luxury [...] lies in craftsmanship" and includes a line from Hafiz and mentions of Wabi-sabi and Thoreau.

History 
Le Labo was founded in 2006 in New York City by Eddie Roschi and Fabrice Penot.

Le Labo was purchased by Estée Lauder Companies in 2014. The brand is now overseen by Esteé Lauder's Group President, John Demsey, alongside other fragrance brands including Jo Malone and Tom Ford. The acquisition has contributed to overall growth in the fragrance category, as Esteé Lauder report increased net sales from Le Labo "reflecting growth from new and certain existing products, as well as targeted expanded consumer reach."

Products

Le Labo produces 18 fragrances and 9 ambient room scents. The formulations do not include animal products, paraben, preservatives or coloration, and are not tested on animals. Fragrances are compounded at the time of purchase with the client's name printed on the labels of the boxes and the perfume bottles. Le Labo also retails items such as tote bags, detergents, and note books online. The brand produces 13 City Exclusive scents which are available only at specific locations. For example, Vanille 44 is sold in Paris and Gaiac 10 in Tokyo.

Perfumers who have created fragrances for the brand include Michel Almairac (Ambrette 9), Annick Ménardo (Patchouli 24) and Maurice Roucel (Jasmine 17 and  Labdanum 18). Le Labo creates a black tea essence fragrance for Edition Hotels.

Fragrances
Le Labo use a standard naming convention for each of their scents. Each fragrance is named after the primary scent note and given a number, which indicates the composition's total ingredient count. Another 13 is an exception to this convention, as it was named after Another Magazine.

Another 13 
Baie 19
Santal 33
Rose 31 
Thé Noir 29 
Bergamote 22 
Vetiver 46 
Lys 41 
Fleur D'oranger 27 
Thé Matcha 26
Neroli 36 
Iris 39 
Patchouli 24 
Ambrette 9 
Jasmin 17 
Oud 27 
Labdanum 18 
Ylang 49
Tonka 25

City exclusives
Aldehyde 44 Dallas
Baie Rose 26 Chicago
Benjoin 19 Moscow
Cuir 28 Dubai
Gaiac 10 Tokyo
Limette 37 San Francisco
Mousse de Chene 30 Amsterdam
Musc 25 Los Angeles
Poivre 23 London
Tubereuse 40 New York
Vanille 44 Paris
Tabac 28 Miami
Bigarade 18 Hong Kong
Citron 28 Seoul
Cedrat 37 Berlin

Locations
The first store opened on Elizabeth Street in New York's Nolita neighborhood. The brand has standalone boutiques and counters in department stores in countries and regions including the US, Saudi Arabia, Canada, Mexico, UK, Germany, France, Belgium, Hong Kong, UAE, Kuwait, Japan, Malaysia, Singapore, Taiwan, Russia, South Korea, Thailand, and Australia.

In popular culture
In Beyoncé's 2016 visual album Lemonade, the singer was depicted burning two Le Labo Santal 26 candles during the sequence for "Sandcastles".

See also
Diptyque
Byredo
Francis Kurkdjian
List of perfumes

References

External links
Instagram

Luxury brands
Perfume houses
Estée Lauder Companies
Niche perfumes